Nola aerugula, the scarce black arches, is a moth of the family Nolidae. The species was first described by Jacob Hübner in 1793.

Subspecies
Nola aerugula aerugula
Nola aerugula holsatica  (Denmark, the Netherlands)

Many authors consider holsatica to be a full species.

Distribution
This species can be found in most of Europe, east to eastern Asia and Japan.
 It is a rare migrant to Great Britain.

Habitat
This species lives on sandy areas and peatlands.

Description
The wingspan is 15–20 mm. These small drab moths show quite variable colors and patterns. The basic color may be gray, brownish or almost white, with brown transverse bands. There are also bright and dark specimens with high-contrast patterns. Forewings are almost triangular with a rounded basal area. The rear wings are gray or brownish. The body is cylindrical. The antennas are filamentous, about half as long as forewings.

Biology
Adults are on wing from June to August in one generation. Males begin to fly just before sunset, and can sometimes be seen in swarms in search of females. The larvae mainly feed on Trifolium and Lotus corniculatus, but also Betula, Salix and Populus species. The larvae of ssp. holsatica feed on Genista anglica and Genista pilosa. Larvae can be found from August to June. They overwinter. Pupation takes place in a cocoon which can be found on the ground or attached to the host plant just above the ground.

Gallery

References

External links
 Lepiforum e. V.
 

aerugula
Moths of Asia
Moths of Europe
Moths of Japan
Moths described in 1793